Appletee is a townland in County Antrim, Northern Ireland. It is situated in the historic barony of Antrim Lower and the civil parish of Connor and covers an area of 226 acres.

The population of the townland decreased during the 19th century:

See also 
List of townlands in County Antrim

References

Townlands of County Antrim
Barony of Antrim Lower